UraiAvia (УРАЙАВИА) was an airline based in Tyumen, Russia which was founded in 1993. Its license has since been revoked.

Incidents 

On 10 August 1995, an Antonov 2R (registration RA-40371) was written off in Mezhdurechensk.  There were no fatalities.

Fleet

Uraiavia operated a fleet of 8 × Mi-8T.

References

Defunct airlines of Russia
Airlines established in 1993
Companies based in Tyumen Oblast